Elroy Maule (May 16, 1913 – April 19, 1984) was an American politician who served in the Iowa House of Representatives from the 57th district from 1957 to 1967.

He died of cancer on April 19, 1984, in Onawa, Iowa at age 70.

References

1913 births
1984 deaths
Democratic Party members of the Iowa House of Representatives